Magazines in Morocco are published in English, Arabic, and French languages. Women's magazines in the country were first published in the 1980s. Below is a list of magazines published in Morocco:

List

Type 

 Daily    Weekly    Seasonal    General    Regional    Finance and economics    Sports    Religion    Women's    Online    Comics

See also
 Media of Morocco
 OJD Morocco 
 List of newspapers in Morocco

Footnotes

References 
  ojd.ma
  medias.ma

Morocco

Magazines

fr:Liste des journaux marocains